The Knee Defender is a device that an airplane passenger can place on the struts that support his/her drop-down airplane seat tray table to limit the extent to which the seat directly in front of him/her can be reclined. The device was invented by Ira Goldman, and it was first sold to the public in 2003.

Controversy 
In August 2014, on a United Airlines flight in North America from Newark to Denver, an argument developed between a passenger using a Knee Defender and the passenger seated in front of him who wanted to recline.  Ultimately the pilot diverted the flight to Chicago and both of those passengers were deplaned.

References 

Airliner seating